Boyton End is a hamlet in Suffolk, England. Boyton was recorded in the Domesday Book as Alia Boituna.

References 

Hamlets in Suffolk
Borough of St Edmundsbury